1,000 Recordings to Hear Before You Die is a musical reference book written by Tom Moon, published in 2008.

Synopsis
It consists of a list of recordings, mostly albums (with some singles), arranged alphabetically by artist or composer. Each entry in the list is accompanied by a short essay followed by genre classifications, Moon's choices for "key tracks" from albums, the next recommended recording from the same artist or composer, and pointers to recordings on the list by other artists that are similar or otherwise related.

Moon also includes a postscript of "108 more recordings to know about".

Moon was a music critic at The Philadelphia Inquirer for 20 years, and has contributed to Rolling Stone, Blender, and other publications.

Genres and contents
Rock recordings dominate the list, which also includes a broad range of classical, jazz, blues, folk, country, R&B, electronica, hip-hop, gospel, opera, musicals, pop, vocals, and world music. Unlike another popular music encyclopedia, 1001 Albums You Must Hear Before You Die, Moon allows the inclusion of albums that may contain non-original material, such as  compilations, greatest-hits packages, Broadway musical cast recordings, and soundtracks.

See also
 Album era
1001 Albums You Must Hear Before You Die

References

External links
Old version of official site (Includes complete list)
From Bach To Bad Brains: 1,000 Recordings To Hear Before You Die at NPR
Before you die, listen to this critic's 'grand' plan at Nashville City Paper

2008 non-fiction books
Music guides